East Cape is a former New Zealand Parliamentary electorate, from 1978 to 1993.

Population centres
The 1977 electoral redistribution was the most overtly political since the Representation Commission had been established through an amendment to the Representation Act in 1886, initiated by Muldoon's National Government. As part of the 1976 census, a large number of people failed to fill out an electoral re-registration card, and census staff had not been given the authority to insist on the card being completed. This had little practical effect for people on the general roll, but it transferred Māori to the general roll if the card was not handed in. Together with a northward shift of New Zealand's population, this resulted in five new electorates having to be created in the upper part of the North Island. The electoral redistribution was very disruptive, and 22 electorates were abolished, while 27 electorates were newly created (including East Cape) or re-established.

Settlements in the original electorate included Whakatane, Opotiki, Taneatua, Te Kaha, Tokomaru Bay, Tolaga Bay, and Matawai. The electorate stopped just short of the city of Gisborne, but included the suburb of Kaiti.

Subsequent boundary changes through the 1983 electoral redistribution drew the electorate further from Gisborne and included Kawerau and Murupara.

In 1993, the East Cape electorate was abolished and most of its area was included in the Eastern Bay of Plenty electorate, with the portion from Hicks Bay to the south of Tokomaru Bay included in the  electorate.

History
The East Cape electorate was first won by Duncan MacIntyre of the National Party in 1978, who had previously been the representative for the Bay of Plenty electorate (1975–78). She held the seat at the subsequent  by less than 240 votes, and in 1989, her name officially reverted to her maiden name Anne Collins after she had separated from her husband.

Tony Ryall from the National Party won the seat in the 1990 general election landslide to the National Party.

Members of Parliament
Key

Notes

References

Historical electorates of New Zealand
Bay of Plenty Region
1978 establishments in New Zealand
1993 disestablishments in New Zealand